Schmohz Brewing Company is a brewery and taproom located in Grand Rapids, Michigan. Jim Schwerin (owner/brewer) and Gabi Palmer (head brewer) are responsible for brewing the beer. Both are alumni of Michigan Technological University (MTU). Schmohz holds a Michigan microbrewery license.

Schmohz products are also available in stores, bars, and restaurants around Michigan. The Taproom (located at 2600 Patterson Ave. SE, Grand Rapids, MI 49546) features 16 taps, including 8 standard beers, 7 seasonal and rotating beers, and a rootbeer soda (great for floats). The Treasure Chest ESB won a gold medal at the 2017 U.S. Open Beer Championship.

In 2009 Schmohz added a biergarten so patrons can drink their beer outside.  Picnic tables and an honor grill populate the biergarten.  Schmohz does not serve food but is outside-food friendly. You can even have food delivered there.

In 2018 Schmohz opened a second taproom inside Mancino's Pizza in Petoskey, Michigan. The Petoskey location has 11 taps which includes a rootbeer soda plus 10 rotating beers.

Schmohz also hosts the West Michigan Chapter of the Michigan Tech Alumni Association monthly meetings and is an integral part of event staff for the Chapter.

References

External links
 Official Company website
 West Michigan Chapter of the Michigan Tech Alumni Association

Companies based in Grand Rapids, Michigan
Beer brewing companies based in Michigan
2004 establishments in Michigan
American companies established in 2004